tRNADB is a curated database of transfer RNA (tRNA). It contains one of the largest numbers of entires among RNA databases.

See also
 tRNA

References

See also 

 Transfer RNA
 Transfer RNA-like structures

External links
 http://trna.nagahama-i-bio.ac.jp.

Biological databases
RNA
Non-coding RNA